Papilio machaon, the Old World swallowtail, is a butterfly of the family Papilionidae. The butterfly is also known as the common yellow swallowtail or simply the swallowtail (a common name applied to all members of the family, but this species was the first to be given the name). It is the type species of the genus Papilio. This widespread species is found in much of the Palearctic (it is the only swallowtail in most of Europe) and in North America.

Etymology
This species is named after Machaon a figure in Greek mythology. He was a son of Asclepius.

Taxonomy
Papilio machaon was named by Carl Linnaeus in the 10th edition of Systema Naturae in 1758, alongside nearly 200 other species of butterfly. Later, Pierre André Latreille designated it as the type species of the genus Papilio. Papilio appalachiensis and Papilio xuthus are also of the same genus.  The specific epithet  refers to Machaon, son of Asclepius in the works of Homer.

Subspecies
There are 41 recognized subspecies, that include: 

 P. m. aliaska Scudder, 1869 (Chukot Peninsula, Alaska to northern British Columbia)
 P. m. annae Gistel, 1857
 P. m. archias Fruhstorfer, 1907 (southern Sichuan)
 P. m. asiaticus Ménétriés, 1855
 P. m. baijangensis Huang & Murayama, 1992 (China: Xinjiang)
 P. m. bairdii Edwards, 1866 (Nevada to Kansas, Arizona, Colorado)
 P. m. birmanicus Rothschild, 1908 (southern Shan States)
 P. m. britannicus (Seitz, 1907) (Great Britain)
 P. m. brucei Edwards, 1893 (Alberta, Saskatchewan to Nebraska, Utah)
 P. m. centralis Staudinger, 1886 (Turan, western Tian-Shan, Ghissar, Darvaz, Alai, western Pamirs)
 P. m. chinensis Verity, 1905 (Sichuan)
 P. m. gorganus Fruhstorfer, 1922 (southern Europe, Ural, Caucasus Major)
 P. m. hippocrates C. & R. Felder, 1864 (Japan)
 P. m. hudsonianus Clark, 1932 (Alberta to Quebec)
 P. m. kamtschadalus Alphéraky, 1897 (Kamchatka)
 P. m. kiyonobu Morita, 1997 (Tibet)
 P. m. kunkalaschani Eller, 1939 (western Sichuan)
 P. m. ladakensis Moore, 1884 (eastern Pamirs)
 P. m. lapponica Verity, 1911 (northern Europe)
 P. m. machaon (Central Europe)
 P. m. mauretanica Verity, 1905 (North Africa)
 P. m. maxima gen.aest. angulata Verity, 1911
 P. m. melitensis Eller, 1936 (Malta)
 P. m. montanus Alphéraky, 1897 (western Sichuan, south-western Gansu, eastern Qinghai, north-western Yunnan)
 P. m. muetingi Seyer, 1976 (southern Arabia, United Arab Emirates)
 P. m. neochinensis Sheljuzhko, 1913 (Ta-tsien-lu)
 P. m. oregonius Edwards, 1876 (southern British Columbia to Oregon, Idaho)
 P. m. oreinus Sheljuzhko, 1919 (Tian-Shan)
 P. m. orientis Verity, 1911 (Altai, Sayan, Transbaikalia, northern Amur, Far East)
 P. m. pikei Sperling, 1987 (Quebec, British Columbia)
 P. m. sachalinensis Matsumura, 1911 (Sakhalin)
 P. m. schapiroi Seyer, 1976 (southern Ussuri)
 P. m. septentrionalis Verity, 1911 (Kurils)
 P. m. sikkimensis Moore, 1884 (Tibet)
 P. m. suroia Tytler, 1939 (Manipur, Assam, northeastern India)
 P. m. sylvina Hemming, 1933 (Taiwan)
 P. m. syriacus Verity, 1908 (Caucasus Minor, Armenia, Talysh Mountains)
 P. m. taliensis Eller, 1939 (northern Yunnan)
 P. m. ussuriensis Sheljuzhko, 1910 (southern Amur, northern and central Ussuri)
 P. m. verityi Fruhstorfer, 1907 (northern Burma, Shan States, southern Yunnan)
 P. m. weidenhofferi Seyer, 1976 (Kopet-Dagh)

Papilio machaon gorganus is strongly migratory in Europe and may be found in almost all habitats. In the UK, P. m. britannicus is an endemic subspecies, but occasionally individuals of the continental subspecies P. m. gorganus breed temporarily on the south coast. Subspecies P. m. britannicus differs from the continental subspecies in being more heavily marked in black. The Maltese Islands are home to another endemic subspecies, P. m. melitensis.

Distribution and status

This butterfly is present throughout the entire Palearctic region, ranging from Russia to China and Japan, (including the Himalayas and Taiwan), and across into Alaska, Canada, and the United States, and thus, is not restricted to the Old World, despite the common name. In Asia, it is reported as far south as Saudi Arabia, Oman, the high mountains of Yemen, Lebanon, Iran and Israel. In southern Asia, it occurs in Pakistan and Kashmir, northern India (Sikkim, to Assam, and Arunachal Pradesh), Nepal, Bhutan, and northern Myanmar.

This butterfly is widespread in Europe. In the United Kingdom, it is limited to a few areas in the Norfolk Broads of East Anglia. It is the UK's largest resident butterfly. The monarch (Danaus plexippus) is slightly larger, but is only a rare vagrant.

As P. machaon is widespread throughout Eurasia and often common, it is not threatened as a species. It is listed as "vulnerable" in the South Korean and Austrian Red Data Books, and in the Red Data Book of the former Soviet Union. In Armenia the species demonstrates stable population trend and is assessed as Least Concern.

In some countries, P. machaon and its subspecies are protected by law. Papilio machaon machaon is protected by law in six provinces of Austria, Czech Republic, Slovakia, Hungary, Romania, and Moldova. The species is protected in the United Kingdom, and subspecies verityi is protected in India.

Description
The hindwings of both sexes have a pair of protruding tails which give the butterfly its common name from the resemblance to the birds of the same name. Just below each tail is one red and six blue eye spots.

When young, the caterpillar resembles a bird dropping, giving it camouflage. The caterpillar also protects itself using a large orange fork which protrudes behind its head.

It can be distinguished from Papilio hospiton, which occurs sympatrically with it on Corsica and Sardinia, by the longer "tails" on the hindwings. It can be told apart from the Algerian species Papilio saharae only by counting the segments on the antennae.

Ecology

The butterfly has a strong and fast flight, but frequently pauses to hover over flowering herbs and sip nectar. It frequents alpine meadows and hillsides, and males are fond of 'hilltopping', congregating near summits to compete for passing females. At lower elevations, it can be seen visiting gardens.

Unlike other swallowtails which specialise on Rutaceae, this species mostly feeds on plants of family Umbelliferae, females laying eggs singly. Milk parsley (also known as marsh hog's fennel) is normally the only food plant used by the caterpillars of the British subspecies. The food plants of the swallowtail in Europe, Asia, and North America are more varied than in the UK. It uses a wide variety of umbellifers including wild carrot (Daucus carota), wild angelica (Angelica sylvestris), fennel (Foeniculum vulgare), and hogweeds (Heracleum). In the Maltese Islands, the caterpillar feeds on plants such as rue (Ruta chalepensis) in addition to Umbelliferae such as fennel.

In India, in Himachal Pradesh, it is found over  only and in Sikkim over  only.

At lower elevations, these butterflies fly from March to September; at higher elevations, they are limited by the short summer seasons.

The British subspecies P. m. brittanicus is less mobile than its European continental counterpart and stays within, or close by, its fenland habitat.

Life cycle
There are usually two to three broods in a year, but in northern areas, the species may be univoltine. In some places such as the UK, some will pupate and emerge in the same year and others will overwinter as pupae before emerging the following year, a situation known as being partially bivoltine.

The caterpillar spends the first part of its life with the appearance of a bird dropping, an effective defense against predators. As the caterpillar grows larger, it becomes green with black and orange markings. It has a defense against predators in the form of an osmeterium, which consists of retractable, fleshy projections behind its head that can release a foul smell if disturbed, which deters insects, but not birds.

Breeding
Old World swallowtails can easily be bred in captivity. Butterflies can be lured to lay eggs in a backyard garden by keeping plenty of caterpillar food plants in it. Common rue plants are highly appropriate for this.

Once eggs or young caterpillars have been collected, they can be kept in a pot with holes on its top to allow air circulation. More than one caterpillar may be kept in a single pot since they do not attack each other (although they might sometimes get frightened by other caterpillars moving). They can be fed any of their food plants. Fennel is one of the easiest to find in the wild. Care must be taken with fennel as well as dill, though, because they will not eat hard, woody stems; they need to be fed the tender leaves. They can also be fed rue or milk parsley. Feeding them with unsuitable plants will lead to death from starvation.

Caterpillars are very fast eaters; they will spend their time eating or resting before they resume their eating again. Once a sufficient size has been attained, they will attach themselves to any available structure with their silky threads. They will then stay still until they become pupae. This will take about a day.

Once in the pupa stage, they can be very carefully removed from the pot and placed in a warm location. The time the butterfly takes to form and come out depends on the temperature. If kept in warm summer temperatures, it will take about one or two weeks to form. On the other hand, if the temperature is lower, it might take as long as several months until it feels the weather is warm enough.

Pupae should not be kept on an impermeable surface, since when they eclose a bit of liquid will be released, this means the butterfly would stay wet and might not be able to fly. Absorbing paper such as the one used in kitchens is advisable.

See also

 List of butterflies of India (Papilionidae)
 List of butterflies of Great Britain

References

External links

 Fauna europaea
 Lepiforum.de
 Moths and Butterflies of Europe and North Africa
 www.schmetterling-raupe.de
 Lectotype of Papilio machaon on the website of the Linnean Society of London. Accessed 8 November 2010.
 UK Butterflies
 Papilio machaon on Guy Padfield's Butterfly Page
 Butterfly Conservation Armenia

machaon
Butterflies of Asia
Butterflies of Europe
Butterflies of Indochina
Butterflies of Borneo
Butterflies of Singapore
Butterflies described in 1758
Taxa named by Carl Linnaeus
Articles containing video clips